The Channel Islands Competition and Regulatory Authorities (CICRA) was the name given to the combined Jersey Competition Regulatory Authority and the Guernsey Competition and Regulatory Authority, which operate in the Bailiwick of Guernsey and the Bailiwick of Jersey in  the Channel Islands. CICRA existed from 2010 to 2020: the authorities for Guernsey and Jersey now function independently.

History

Formed in December 2010, CICRA was responsible for administering and enforcing the Competition (Jersey) Law 2005 and The Competition (Guernsey) Ordinance 2012. The purpose of the legislation is to prevent consumers being harmed by anti-competitive or exploitative behaviour in the market.

The decision to form a joint body was taken because of the similarity of needs and the reduction in duplication through economies of scale. Resources available to CICRA were limited.

The joint body was disbanded in July 2020.

Areas of responsibility
The areas of responsibility were:

 Competition law 
 Some areas of work are discretionary, others such as a duty to investigate mergers and acquisitions are statutory 
 Telecommunications 
 Regulator
 Postal sectors 
 Regulator looking at quality and universal service obligations
 Electricity – Guernsey 2012
 Regulator
 Ports – Jersey 2015
 Economic regulatory authority, to protect and further the interests of users of port operations and where appropriate promote competition

Board

CICRA's board comprised a chairman, three executive directors and three non-executive directors. There were fewer than ten staff spread between two offices in the two islands.

Areas of contention
An investigation by CICRA into possible market abuse by a States of Guernsey contract in 2016 was blocked as the States refused to supply CICRA with the necessary funding. The investigation was dropped in January 2017.

The ownership of regulated companies by the governments, such as Jersey Post and Guernsey Electricity, could produce conflicts.

References

External links

2020 disestablishments in the United Kingdom
2010 establishments in British Overseas Territories
Communications authorities
Competition regulators
Consumer organisations in the United Kingdom
Economy of Guernsey
Economy of Jersey
Regulation in the United Kingdom